Nicholas Joseph Fury, more commonly known as Nick Fury, is a fictional character portrayed by Samuel L. Jackson in the Marvel Cinematic Universe (MCU) media franchise, based on the Marvel Comics character of the same name. Fury is depicted as the Director of S.H.I.E.L.D. who creates and enacts the Avengers Initiative after discovering other threats to the Earth.

, Fury has appeared in eleven MCU films, beginning with an appearance in the post-credits scene of Iron Man (2008). He also appeared in two episodes of the television series Agents of S.H.I.E.L.D. (2013–14) and three episodes of the animated series What If...? (2021) as different versions of the character, with Jackson reprising the role. He will star as the main protagonist of the miniseries Secret Invasion (2023), with his storyline leading into the upcoming film The Marvels (2023), in which Fury is set to return. Prior to the formation of the MCU, Marvel Comics incorporated Jackson's likeness into the reimagined design of the character for The Ultimates.

Concept, creation, and characterization

Fury originally appeared in American comic books published by Marvel Comics. Created by writer/artist Jack Kirby and writer Stan Lee, Fury first appeared in Sgt. Fury and his Howling Commandos No. 1 (May 1963), a World War II combat series that portrayed the cigar-chomping Fury as leader of an elite U.S. Army unit. In 1998, David Hasselhoff portrayed Fury in the Fox television movie Nick Fury: Agent of S.H.I.E.L.D., which was intended to be a backdoor pilot for a possible new TV series, which did not materialize. In 2002, Marvel Comics designed their "Ultimate" version of the character Nick Fury after the likeness of Samuel L. Jackson. However, Marvel Studios initially discussed a potential film role with George Clooney, who turned it down after reviewing some of the comic book source material and finding Fury to be too violent of a character. According to the audio commentary of the 2007 film Fantastic Four: Rise of the Silver Surfer, director Tim Story said the script originally contained Nick Fury, but the role eventually became that of General Hager (played by Andre Braugher), as having Fury would have forced 20th Century Fox to purchase the rights to that character.

In the mid-2000s, Kevin Feige realized that Marvel still owned the rights to the core characters, which included Fury. Feige, a self-professed "fanboy", envisioned creating a shared universe just as creators Stan Lee and Jack Kirby had done with their comic books in the early 1960s. In 2004, David Maisel was hired as chief operating officer of Marvel Studios as he had a plan for the studio to self-finance movies. Marvel entered into a non-recourse debt structure with Merrill Lynch, under which Marvel got $525million to make a maximum of 10 movies based on the company's properties over eight years, collateralized by certain movie rights to a total of 10 characters, including Nick Fury.

Jackson was then offered the role, initially signing a nine-film contract with Marvel to portray Nick Fury in the Marvel Cinematic Universe. In 2019, Jackson confirmed that, while that year's Captain Marvel marked the end of his nine-film contract with Marvel, he would continue to portray Fury in future films. Jackson thereafter appeared in a cameo in Avengers: Endgame, and in a substantial role in Spider-Man: Far From Home.

The MCU version of Nick Fury jettisoned a number of details from the original comic book version. Aside from the original character having been white (a detail already changed in the comics before the MCU came to fruition), the original comic book Nick Fury was a World War II veteran who knew Captain America and led the Howling Commandos, and lost sight in his left eye during a grenade attack in that war. In both the original comic book and the Ultimate Marvel versions, Fury was able to remain active many decades after the war because he aged unnaturally slowly due to regular doses of an Infinity Formula. A popular character over a number of decades, in 2011, Fury was ranked 33rd in IGN's "Top 100 Comic Book Heroes", and 32nd in their list of "The Top 50 Avengers". He has sometimes been considered an antihero.

Appearances

Fury is introduced in the post-credits scene of Iron Man (2008), meeting Tony Stark at his Malibu home to discuss the Avengers Initiative.

In Iron Man 2 (2010), Fury sends in Natasha Romanoff to pose as an assistant to and assess Stark to see if he is worth recruiting for the Initiative and helps Stark deal with his palladium illness and Ivan Vanko. At the end, he hires him as a consultant for the Initiative.

In the post-credits scene for Thor (2011), Fury enlists Dr. Erik Selvig’s help to study the Tesseract.

In Captain America: The First Avenger (2011), Fury greets Steve Rogers: "You've been asleep, Cap, for almost seventy years."

In The Avengers (2012), Fury is present with Clint Barton when Loki arrives on Earth to take the Tesseract to lead the Chitauri invasion. After this, he, Phil Coulson, and Maria Hill decide to start the Initiative. Fury brings Romanoff, Rogers, Stark, Bruce Banner, Thor, and Barton together to form the Avengers. Noting that he does more in The Avengers than in any of the previous films, Jackson said, "You don't have to wait until the end of the movie to see me". About the role, Jackson said, "It's always good to play somebody [who] is a positive in society as opposed to somebody who is a negative. . . I tried to make him as honest to the story and as honest to what real-life would seem." Jackson compared the character to Ordell Robbie in Jackie Brown, calling him "a nice guy to hang out with. You just don't want to cross him". Jackson earned $4–6 million for the film.

In 2013 and 2014, Fury appeared in two episodes of the MCU TV series, Agents of S.H.I.E.L.D., "0-8-4" (2013) and "Beginning of the End" (2014). In "0-8-4", Fury appears at the end to scold Coulson over damage caused to a S.H.I.E.L.D. plane during a fight, and expresses his doubts over the loyalty of Skye. In June 2013, Jackson expressed interest in appearing in the show as Fury, which led to his cameo appearance at the end of this episode. Executive producer Jeph Loeb said "There were obviously a number of places that we thought Nick Fury would have a big impact on the show, but the more we talked about it, [the more we wanted] to get him in very early, so that it would kind of christen the show, legitimize it in its own way". It was a challenge for the showrunners to keep Jackson's cameo a surprise due to "this age of tweets and spoilers".

In Captain America: The Winter Soldier (2014), an attempt is made on Fury's life by Hydra, which is revealed to have taken over S.H.I.E.L.D. Fury fakes his death and, once Hydra's plan to control the world is foiled with the help of Rogers, Romanoff, and Sam Wilson, heads to Eastern Europe to hunt down the remaining Hydra cells. Regarding Fury's questionable code of ethics displayed, Jackson said, "Almost everything that comes out of Nick Fury's mouth is a lie in some sense. He has to ask, is he even lying to himself, too? He has a very good idea of what's going on but his paranoia keeps him from believing some of it." Jackson added, "You see Nick Fury the office guy, him going about the day-to-day work of S.H.I.E.L.D. and the politics as opposed to that other stuff. It's great to have him dealing with Captain America in terms of being able to speak to him soldier to soldier and try to explain to him how the world has changed in another way while he was frozen in time. Some of the people who used to be our enemies are now our allies—him trying to figure out, 'Well, how do we trust those guys?' or 'How do we trust the guys that you didn't trust who don't trust you?' And explaining to him that the black and white of good guys/bad guys has now turned into this gray area." McFeely said, "Fury represents an obstacle for Steve in some ways. They don't always agree on how S.H.I.E.L.D. ought to be used." The writers gave Fury a more prominent role in The Winter Soldier, since within a plot featuring S.H.I.E.L.D. being dismantled, Fury would "take the brunt of it". They also intended on depicting a character that had so far been depicted as a self-assured, commanding man as vulnerable, to enhance the sense of danger in the Hydra conspiracy.

Fury appears in the Agents of S.H.I.E.L.D. first season finale, "Beginning of the End", which deals with the aftermath of the events of Winter Soldier.

In Avengers: Age of Ultron (2015), Fury shows up on Barton's homestead to help and motivate the team to formulate a plan to stop Ultron from destroying humanity. He and other former agents of S.H.I.E.L.D. use a helicarrier provided to them by Coulson in the final battle against Ultron. Later, he helps get things running at the new Avengers Compound. Jackson described the role as a cameo, saying, "I'm just kind of passing by there ... Because, it's another one of those 'people who have powers fighting people who have powers'. That's why I didn't get to New York in The Avengers. There's not a lot I could do except shoot a gun."

In the post-credits scene of Avengers: Infinity War (2018), Fury and Hill discuss the battle in Wakanda and Stark's current status. When Fury begins disintegrating from the Blip, he uses a modified pager to send a distress signal.

In Captain Marvel (2019), which is set in 1995, a younger Fury appears and he is still a low-level bureaucrat. Fury appears without his signature eye patch. Feige explained that Danvers is the first superhero that Fury has come across, which sets him on a path to his role working with heroes in later-set MCU films. Jackson described Fury at this point as a desk jockey, who has not yet become cynical towards bureaucracy and who learns in the film that there are superpowered beings who could help S.H.I.E.L.D. Towards the end, Fury loses sight in his left eye after being scratched by the Flerken/cat Goose, and is inspired to create the Avengers Initiative by Danvers' example, naming the protocol after her old callsign. Jackson added that trusting Danvers plays a key role in his development, as they become "compatriots" throughout the film. Jackson was digitally de-aged by 25 years, the first time Marvel has done this for an entire film.

In Avengers: Endgame (2019), Fury is restored to life. He attends Stark's funeral and reunites with Danvers.

In the post-credits scene of Spider-Man: Far From Home (2019), Fury takes a vacation in space on a Skrull spaceship, having recruited Talos and Soren to replace him and Hill and give Stark's glasses to Peter Parker.

In August 2020, actor Jeff Ward revealed that Agents of S.H.I.E.L.D. series writer DJ Doyle had pitched a post-credits scene for the Agents of S.H.I.E.L.D. series finale that was not shot, that featured Ward's character Deke Shaw sitting in a S.H.I.E.L.D. office in the alternate timeline he ends the series trapped in, serving as the organization's Director and wearing an eye patch. Ward added, since it was unclear if Nick Fury was still alive in the alternate timeline, Deke would have worn it because it felt like "a power and cool thing", with Deke ultimately serving as a partial adaptation of the original version of the character.

Jackson has portrayed the character in two video game products. Jackson reprised his role as Fury in the 2010 video game adaptation of Iron Man 2, and again in the 2014 video game Disney Infinity: Marvel Super Heroes and its 2015 sequel, Disney Infinity 3.0.

Jackson reprised his voice-speaking role as Fury in the Disney+ animated series What If...?.

Fury will return in the live action series Secret Invasion and in the film The Marvels (both 2023).

Fictional character biography

Early developments

Nicholas Joseph Fury was born in Huntsville, Alabama on 7 April 1950. He joined the United States Army after graduating from high school, eventually becoming a Colonel. He later left the army to join the Central Intelligence Agency, where he served as a spy during the Cold War. He was eventually recruited to the covert espionage agency S.H.I.E.L.D.

In 1995, Kree Empire Starforce member Vers crash-lands in Los Angeles, drawing S.H.I.E.L.D. agents Fury and Phil Coulson to investigate. In an ensuing Skrull attack, Fury kills a Skrull impersonating Coulson. Skrull commander Talos, disguised as Fury's boss Keller, orders Fury to work with Vers and keep tabs on her. Vers, escaping capture by the Skrull, uses memories they have extracted to bring Fury to the Project Pegasus installation at a U.S. Air Force base. They discover Vers was Carol Danvers, a pilot presumed to have died in 1989 while testing an experimental jet engine designed by Dr. Wendy Lawson, whom Vers recognizes as a woman from her nightmares. After Fury informs S.H.I.E.L.D. of their location, a team led by Talos disguised as Keller arrives. Fury discovers Talos's ruse and helps Vers escape in a quadjet with Lawson's stowaway cat Goose. They fly to Louisiana to meet former pilot Maria Rambeau, the last person to see Vers and Lawson alive. Later, Danvers, Talos, Fury, and Rambeau locate Lawson's cloaked laboratory orbiting Earth, where Lawson hid several Skrulls, including Talos's family, and the Tesseract, the power source of Lawson's engine. Danvers is captured by Starforce, and in the subsequent battle, Fury retrieves Goose, who is revealed to be an alien Flerken. Goose swallows the Tesseract and scratches Fury's face, blinding his left eye. Danvers departs to help the Skrulls find a new homeworld, leaving Fury a modified pager to contact her in an emergency. Meanwhile, Fury drafts an initiative to locate heroes like Danvers, naming it after her Air Force call sign, "Avenger".

Later, Fury became the Deputy Chief of S.H.I.E.L.D.'s Bogotá station, where he "proved his leadership mettle" by engineering the rescue of hostages captured by Colombian rebels at the country's embassy, including the daughter of then-S.H.I.E.L.D. Director Alexander Pierce, prompting Pierce to make him director of S.H.I.E.L.D., while Pierce joined the World Security Council.

Assembling the Avengers

In 2010, Fury visits Tony Stark in his Malibu home and recruits him into the "Avengers Initiative".

Six months later in 2011, Fury approaches Stark at Randy's Donuts, revealing that Stark's recently acquired new assistant "Natalie Rushman" is S.H.I.E.L.D. Agent Natasha Romanoff and that his father Howard was a S.H.I.E.L.D. founder whom Fury knew personally. Fury explains that Vanko's father Anton and Howard invented the arc reactor together, but when Anton tried to sell it, Howard had him deported. Fury gives Stark some of his father's old material, enabling Stark to synthesize a new element for his arc reactor that ends his palladium dependency. Later, Fury informs Stark that because of his difficult personality, S.H.I.E.L.D. intends to use him only as a consultant.

Shortly before the Battle of New York in 2012, Fury enlists Dr. Erik Selvig to study the Tesseract. In New York City, he oversees the reintroduction of Steve Rogers into society. Fury is present with his colleague and friend Maria Hill at the S.H.I.E.L.D. facility when Loki arrives to steal the Tesseract and take control of Agent Clint Barton and Selvig. Fury calls in Romanoff, Stark, Rogers, and Bruce Banner to fight Loki. Later, Fury uses Coulson's death to motivate the Avengers, now including Thor, to work as a team, leading to their stand against Loki and the invading Chitauri army in New York City. When the World Security Council authorizes the nuclear bombing of the city to defeat the invasion, Fury uses a rocket launcher to take out one of the two jets launching for that mission, but is too late to stop the second, which fires a missile that is intercepted by Stark.

After Loki's defeat, Fury authorizes the use of alien technology to resurrect Coulson from death and, in response to the invasion, convinces the Council that the world needs "a quantum surge in threat analysis".

Fighting Hydra and Ultron

In 2014, Fury trains Rogers to be a S.H.I.E.L.D. agent and proposes Project Insight: three S.H.I.E.L.D. Helicarriers armed with spy satellite guided guns, designed to preemptively eliminate threats. The Helicarriers are capable of continuous suborbital flight, due to new Repulsor engines proposed by Stark, their guns can kill 1,000 targets per minute, and the satellites, launched from the Lemurian Star, a S.H.I.E.L.D. vessel, can read a target's DNA anywhere in the world. However, when the project is a few weeks away from completion, Fury grows suspicious about Insight. He hires an Algerian mercenary, Georges Batroc, to hijack the Star as cover to allow Romanoff onto the ship with Rogers to retrieve data regarding Insight. Though Romanoff is successful, Fury is unable to decrypt the data, increasing his suspicions and forcing him to convince Pierce to delay the project. Shortly afterwards, an attempt is made on Fury's life by Hydra, which is revealed to have taken over S.H.I.E.L.D. Fury is apparently killed by their most dangerous assassin, the Winter Soldier, but he is revealed to have faked his death using Tetrodotoxin B, a drug designed by Banner that was capable of slowing down the heart to 1 beat per minute. Rogers, Sam Wilson, and Romanoff are taken by Hill to see him alive and in a hidden bunker. After it is revealed that Pierce is working for Hydra, Fury reappears to override Hydra's control of S.H.I.E.L.D.'s computer systems, forcing Pierce to unlock S.H.I.E.L.D's database so Romanoff can leak classified information, exposing Hydra to the public. Fury reveals that although Pierce had deleted Fury's retinal scan from the system, Fury had a backup scan of his destroyed other eye. He then tells Rogers, Wilson, and Romanoff that he is to go into hiding in Europe to hunt down more Hydra cells.

Once Hydra's plan to control the world is foiled, Fury appears to assist S.H.I.E.L.D. agents in the aftermath of those events, rescuing agents Leo Fitz and Jemma Simmons from drowning in the ocean and providing Agent Coulson with the Destroyer gun to take out enemy soldiers, before they confront John Garrett and Deathlok. In the aftermath, Coulson vaporizes Garrett and criticizes Fury for using GH325 to revive him. Fury responds that he values Coulson as much as any Avenger, because he represents the heart and moral center of S.H.I.E.L.D., and declares Coulson the new director of S.H.I.E.L.D., tasking him with rebuilding the organization from scratch, and equips him with a 'toolbox' containing useful data.

In 2015, Fury arrives at Barton's home to help and motivate Stark, Rogers, Romanoff, Banner, and Barton to formulate a plan to stop Ultron. He, Hill, and other former agents of S.H.I.E.L.D., and James Rhodes use the original helicarrier to help the Avengers in Sokovia during the final battle against Ultron. Afterwards, he oversees the Avengers transition into the new Avengers Compound.

Coulson subsequently reveals to Gonzalez and his board that he and Fury had discovered that the original helicarrier survived HYDRA's attack and repaired it as a failsafe in case of an emergency.

Aftermath of the Infinity War

In 2018, Fury and Hill are travelling in Atlanta discussing the Avengers' whereabouts when Hill suddenly disintegrates due to the Blip, prompting Fury to use his pager to summon Danvers, before he too disintegrates.

In 2023, Fury is restored to life and attends Stark's funeral, reuniting with Danvers. Some time later, he appoints Talos and Soren to impersonate him and Hill while he takes a vacation in space on a Skrull ship.

In 2024, Fury is informed by Talos via phone call that Peter Parker received Tony Stark's glasses. Talos then asked Fury to come back to Earth, as people were beginning to ask what happened to the Avengers. Still in space, Fury disconnects the call.

Alternate versions

Several alternate versions of Nick Fury appear in the animated series What If...?, with Jackson reprising his role.

Meeting Captain Carter

In an alternate 2012, Fury and Barton meet Captain Carter after she arrives through a portal opened by the Tesseract.

Death of the Avengers

In an alternate 2010, Fury witnesses Stark, Barton, Thor, and Romanoff's deaths during his Avengers Initiative recruitment campaign. He eventually deduces that their murders were instigated by Hank Pym and temporarily allies with Loki to confront him in San Francisco. After Pym is defeated, Loki quickly subjugates the planet and becomes its ruler, prompting Fury to summon Danvers and awaken Rogers.

Sometime later, Fury leads a resistance movement against Loki and his army with a new Avengers team composed of Rogers and Danvers. As they fight on the Helicarrier, Fury watches as a Romanoff from another universe appears and subdues Loki with his Scepter. Despite acknowledging that she is not the Romanoff he knows, Fury praises her for sharing the same spirit and recruits her into the Avengers.

Stopping Thor's party

In an alternate timeline, Fury goes to Las Vegas to confront Thor regarding his out-of-control intergalactic party, but is accidentally knocked out by Korg during one of his cannonballs and falls into a coma, forcing Maria Hill to take over as acting director of S.H.I.E.L.D.

Reception

Critical response
In a generally positive review of The Avengers, Associated Press reviewer Christy Lemire wrote that "[t]he no-nonsense Nick Fury (Samuel L. Jackson), the head of S.H.I.E.L.D.—which had been entrusted with the safety of [the Tesseract]—springs into action to reacquire it by assembling a dream team of superheroes and other sundry bad-asses with specialized skills." Reviewing The Winter Soldier, Todd McCarthy of The Hollywood Reporter said that "from a dramatic point of view, the greatest interest lies with Jackson and Redford, two great veterans whose presence lends weight to the fantastical proceedings and whose characters take some interesting twists and turns before it's all over." Chris E. Hayne of GameSpot ranked Fury 19th in their "38 Marvel Cinematic Universe Superheroes" list, writing, "There is no Avengers without Nick Fury. The former director of SHIELD started the Avenger initiative and at this point we know he's out there in space somewhere, just waiting for the change to wind up back on earth."

Fury was noted to have been "largely missing in Phase Three of the Marvel Cinematic Universe", with both Jackson and fans of the franchise being "bummed that Fury was left out of Civil War and Black Panther", though he later had a substantial role in Captain Marvel. Writing for Variety, Owen Gleiberman said of the latter film that the "digitally de-aged Samuel L. Jackson" in Captain Marvel was "done a surprising favor by the visual trickery. He seems different than usual—lighter and perkier."

Jackson himself is fond of playing the character. After receiving an 
honorary Oscar in 2021, he remarked in an interview with the Los Angeles Times that he prefers the role over ones in what he described as “statue chasing movies.”

Accolades

See also
 Characters of the Marvel Cinematic Universe
 Outline of the Marvel Cinematic Universe
 Nick Fury in other media

References

External links
 Nick Fury on the Marvel Cinematic Universe Wiki
 
 Nick Fury at Marvel.com

Agents of S.H.I.E.L.D.
Black characters in films
Fictional Central Intelligence Agency personnel
Fictional United States Army personnel
Fictional characters missing an eye
Fictional colonels
Fictional military strategists
Fictional people from the 20th-century
Fictional people from the 21st-century
Fictional spymasters
Film characters introduced in 2008
Male characters in film
Male characters in television
Marvel Cinematic Universe characters
Nick Fury in other media
S.H.I.E.L.D. agents